Gaston Park was a baseball park located in Dallas, Texas. Named for landowner William H. Gaston, the ballpark existed within the State Fair grounds in the vicinity of Texas and Pacific rail tracks as well as the Music Hall at Fair Park in Dallas. The field was also used for the Red River Rivalry in 1912 and 1914. Oklahoma beat Texas 21–6 in 1912 while the Longhorns beat the Sooners 32–7 in 1914. The A&M College of Texas, as it was then known, beat Baylor University there on Thanksgiving Day 1912 by score of 53–0.

Early newspaper reports of Texas League baseball games were stated as "at the fair grounds". The Sanborn maps show the grandstand at the northeast corner of Parry Avenue and Second Avenue, with other fairgrounds facilities to the east of the ballpark.

Sources

References

External links
Sanborn map showing the fairgrounds ballpark in 1892
Sanborn map showing the fairgrounds ballpark in 1899
Sanborn map showing the fairgrounds ballpark in 1905

American football venues in the Dallas–Fort Worth metroplex
Baseball venues in the Dallas–Fort Worth metroplex